Padampur is a municipality in Chitwan District in the Narayani Zone of southern Nepal. At the time of the 1991 Nepal census it had a population of 8,884 people living in 1,559 individual households. It was transferred in new location named Saguntol by Government of Nepal and completed with in 8 years  i.e. from 2050 BS to 2058 BS. Previously it was at the lap of Rapati river  and inside the  Chitwan National Park. Flood of Rapati river in monsoon season destroy farmers crops. Wild animals also harmed their crops. Transportation, electricity, road  and educational facilities were beyond people's access. It was known as one of the remote areas of the Chitwan district. In a view of agriculture, It was the best place for farmers. After the new dawn of democracy in 2046, New government was asked to shift this village for peoples safety and conservation of forest and wild animal. The cabinet of Girija Prasad Koirala  was  assured to shift in a convenience place soon and started the task immediately. This task was successfully done by the politician Baburam Puri of the Nepali Congress. The late Sailaja Acharya visited the people and understood their griefs and proposed to shift it next to Sagoontol near Jutpani VDC. This was a very difficult task to accomplish successfully. People from the Western Chitwan were stood against it but government took bold decision in favour of people of Padampur. Electricity, roads and transportation facility are comparatively  better here. 2,800 households were there now. According to the 2001 census, the total population of the VDC was 11,336 with total households 2,137 (Immigration increased rapidly after relocation by almost 50% with in 10 years  reaching 3,231 households consisting 14,924 people). Tharus are the dominant ethnic group with 45.89%  of the total VDC population. Brahman, Kshetri, Tamang, Gurung  and Newar are other castes  here. Mainly banana, maize and oil are farmed here. Except ward no 1 there are deep tubewells to  Irrigate farmlands. Poultry, dairy, epiculture, mushroom farming and goat keeping have great potentials here. A campus, A higher secondary school, a secondary boarding school  and other 7 primary and lower secondary schools are providing  education here. Health post, and Post office are too doing their best for providing services to locals. Drinking water is provided in better and modern way. Pipelines of drinking water are available  within  all roads (113 km) of Padampur. An NGO veterinary office  is also serving and helping farmers. Since last 5 years this VDC is starting to be known  as one of pocket areas of commercial banana farming of the nation. Nobody is landless here and this is the special feature here. Padampur is very attractive location for migratory view and daily people are migrating here. It is like a colonial place for settlement of people. Government has sifted it in a well planned way and that is why it is the second model VDC of Nepal (first is In Bardiya district). Now this village has merged in Kalika Municipality and shares 4 wards in it i.e. Kalika -9, Kalika-10, Kalika-11 and Kalika-12.

Wards  ( tols)

Kamalpur               Padampur-1
Jitpur                 Padampur-2
Pipariya               Padampur-4
Khekhadiya            Padampur-3
Bhimpur               Padampur-5
Dhedauli              Padampur-6
Marchauli             Padampur-7
Bankatta              Padampur-8
Gadauli               Padampur-9

Places of interest
Being newly created VDC of Nepal, it was popularly known in all Nepal for its better location. Researchers and students frequently choose it for the social issues. It is famous for its planned model of geography. People wonder when they come first time here. Bhimbali temple, water tank, community forest, dairy office and high school are attractive to view.

Schools of Padampur

Bhimodaya Higher Secondary School
Nimabi Dhedauli
Nimabi Gadauli
Nimabi Kamalpur
Nimabi Bankatta
Ra Pra Bi Sahapur
Ra Pra Bi Pipariya
Rashtiya Samudayik Pra Bi
Padampur Siksha Niketan
Janahit Ra. Pra. Vi Simalbasti 8
Chitrawan Secondary Boarding School

Shaheed Smriti Multiple Campus spread-ed wing
Shaheed Smriti multiple campus is located in Padampur -4. It was started from 2061 BS and conducting graduation study locally. It is another attraction of this VDC. It is the extension branch of Saheed Smriti Multiple Campus, Ratnanagar, Tandi. Hari prasad Kadel was the co-coordinator of this campus in incorporating time. Mr. Posta Raj Aryal is the recent coordinator here.

. With a history stretching back over 30 years( main campus at Ratnanagar), providing quality education within a modern educational environment and strong academic staffs, Shaheed Smriti Multiple campus is strongly identified with its academic excellence and homely environment. Since its inception and foundation, SSMC has assumed a pivotal role in educating marginalized and disadvantaged people of the community. SSMC has been providing quality education to the students by providing access to modern education facilities and affordable fees. Now, SSMC has been running classes in different faculties such as Management, Education and Humanities from under graduate to Masters Level. The campus is fully devoted in producing competent and skilled professionals in the related fields.

Vision:
SSMC will be an academically sound, economically self-sustained, socially responsible and culturally harmonious centre of excellence both as an academic institution providing highly demanding quality education; and as an international centre for research developing and disseminating knowledge of national/international quest and demand.

Mission: 
The mission of SSMC is to develop itself as a leading academic institution that will provide equal opportunity of quality education for all at affordable fee structure. The guiding principles of this institution are quality, financial sustainability, demand orientation and equality

Recognition:
University Grants Commission (UGC) recognizes SSMC for its precious academic history and excellent results. UGC has selected this campus for Second Higher Education Project throughout Nepal.

Affiliation: 
Tribhunan University, Kirtipur, Kathmandu

Cooperative organizations
For marginal and almost people need saving for the 
endowment of their different family works. For it, cooperative organization are primarily important. Some successfully operating cooperative organizations are as follows.

Prajwal Mahila Bachat Tatha Rin Sahakari Sanstha Ltd.
Padampur Bachaht Tatha Rin Sahakari Sanstha Ltd.
Shree Bhimkali Bachat Tatha Rin Sahakari Sanstha Ltd.
Yati Bahuuddessiya Bachat Tatha Rin Sahakari Sanstha Ltd.
Nari Kalyan Bachat Tatha Rin Sahakari Sanstha Ltd.
Padampur Dugdha Utpadak Sahakari Sanstha Ltd.
Sahamati Upabhokta Sahakari Sanstha Ltd.

Political leaders
For the development of local area, local leaders are contributing us. Not less but more some leaders have played key roles to shift this VDC from the previous location i.e. Rapatipari. Still they are serving us continuously and that is why we are credited towards them. Some of our leaders are as follows:

 Nanada Pd. Bhattrai 
 Dimbar Ram Chaudhary
 Hatthuram Chaudhary
 Jitbahadur Chaudhary
 Jayachandra Chaudhary 
 Ramchandra Poudel

Bhimodaya model school
It is the only one higher secondary school of Padampur. Approximately 1200 students are currently studying here from nursery to grade 12.  There are 36 staff members. Dr. Hari Prasad Kandel  is the principal and Ram pd.dhakal is the vice principal of the school. The school building consists of two 3-storied buildings and one 2-storied  building with program hall . It is located in the middle of the VDC. Approximately 1200 students are studying here. It has started English medium classes and fascinating more students and parents these days. Clean, green and peace is the motto of this school this time with quality education. It has aimed to stand the pioneer school in the district.

Padampur drinking water and sanitation consumers society 

It is the main drinking water supply office of Padampur and was founded in 2061. It is located at Padampur-8. It is based on water resource rule of Nepal and affiliated to Khane pani division office Chitwan. It is Deep Tubewell water system and covered the whole Padampur VDC having piping more than 100 km, it is one of modern and expensive project accomplished by government sector. The overhead water tank is 32 meters high and can carry 4,50,000 liters at once. It has more than 15,000 consumers. The drinking water is no more main issue in this place.

Except main underground drinking water supply system there are three other independent drinking water supply communities in ward no 1 (started since BS 2056), 2 and 8 (started since BS 2059). The water sources of these communities are located in the Mahabharat hill. The spa of the communities 2 and 8 is same where as community (Churiya ) of ward no. 1  gets from spa near Gairibaari, a village of Shaktikhor VDC. These three communities have their own overhead water tanks capable of storing 60,000 L of water.

Moreover, there are several manually dug water wells for drinking water, especially in ward no 6, 5, 4, and 9 more successfully by private sector.

Society of Padampur
There are varieties of people living in Padampur. Tharu people are the main land owner then  but now they are in minority in population. Tamang, Gurung, Brahmin, Newar, Darai, Chepang and other castes of people live here. The migration rate is growing day by day. It has been famous place in Nepal.

Populated places in Chitwan District
Village development committees (Nepal)